The Boston Teapot Trophy is an international award given to the sail training vessel that covers the greatest distance within a 124-hour period.

References
National Institute for Sea Training

Sail training
Sports trophies and awards